Oza Tétrault (1 May 1908 – 17 October 1995) was a Ralliement créditiste and Social Credit party member of the House of Commons of Canada. He was a president and manager by career.

He was first elected at the Villeneuve riding in
the 1968 general election under the Ralliement créditiste party banner. He was re-elected at Villeneuve in the 1972 election, with his party assuming the Social Credit name in 1971. After completing his term in the 29th Canadian Parliament, Tétrault left federal politics and did not campaign in any further federal elections.

His son, Ronald Tétrault, became a Quebec provincial and municipal politician.

External links
 
 Biography of Oza Tétrault 

1908 births
1995 deaths
20th-century Canadian businesspeople
Members of the House of Commons of Canada from Quebec
People from Sudbury District
Social Credit Party of Canada MPs
Franco-Ontarian people